Cambridge Junction Historic State Park is a historic preservation area located three miles south of Brooklyn in Cambridge Township, Michigan. The state park is the site of Walker Tavern, a major stopping place for stagecoaches traveling between Detroit and Chicago in the early nineteenth century.

The tavern has been operated seasonally by the Michigan History Center since 1965. It is part of an 80-acre site that includes two additional historic structures: a reconstructed barn with artifacts and exhibits about people, travel and work in the 1840s and 1850s, and the 1929 Hewitt House Visitors Center that focuses on early auto tourism, with displays about well-known Irish Hills roadside tourist attractions of the 20th century.

References

External links
Cambridge Junction Historic State Park Michigan Department of Natural Resources

State parks of Michigan
Protected areas of Lenawee County, Michigan
Protected areas established in 1965
1965 establishments in Michigan